The 1911 American Cup was the annual open cup held by the American Football Association. Twenty-eight teams entered the tournament. Howard & Bullough of Pawtucket were the winners of this edition.

American Cup Bracket

a) aggregate after 3 games

Final

Replay

Hibs: GK O'Donnell, RF Danks, LF Wilson(c), RMF Waltermate, CMF Blaney, LMF Tillie, OR Burroughs, IR Godfrey, CF Gallagher, IL Smith, OL Hinds.H&B: GK Healey, RF O'Toole(c), LF Donnelly, RMF Creighton, CMF Brown, LMF Blakely, OR Harvey, IR McKay, CF W.Pemberton, IL E.Pemberton, OL Cannan.

Amer
American Cup